Long Pond is located by Oswegatchie Camp, New York. Fish species present in the lake are splake, white sucker, and black bullhead. There is a state owned beach launch on Prentice Road, 4 miles northwest of Croghan. There is a 10 horsepower motor limit. 

Long Pond is known for Taylor Swift's "Long Pond" sessions.

Tributaries and locations

Rock Pond – A small pond located north of Long Pond. The West Branch Oswegatchie River flows through Round Pond.
Round Pond – A bay of Long Pond. Located where the West Branch Oswegatchie River enters the lake.
Trout Lake – A small lake located north of Long Pond.

References

Lakes of Lewis County, New York